Pseudobunaea is a genus of moths in the family Saturniidae first described by Eugène Louis Bouvier in 1927.

Species
Pseudobunaea alinda (Drury, 1782)
Pseudobunaea barnsi Bouvier, 1930
Pseudobunaea bjornstadi Bouyer, 2006
Pseudobunaea callista (Jordan, 1910)
Pseudobunaea cleopatra (Aurivillius, 1893)
Pseudobunaea cyrene (Weymer, 1909)
Pseudobunaea dayensis Rougeot, Bourgogne & Laporte, 1991
Pseudobunaea deaconi Stoneham, 1962
Pseudobunaea epithyrena (Maassen & Weyding, 1885)
Pseudobunaea heyeri (Weymer, 1896)
Pseudobunaea illustris Weymer, 1901
Pseudobunaea immaculata Bouvier, 1930
Pseudobunaea inornata (Sonthonnax, 1901)
Pseudobunaea irius (Fabricius, 1793)
Pseudobunaea melinde (Maassen & Weyding, 1885)
Pseudobunaea meloui (Riel, 1910)
Pseudobunaea morlandi (Rothschild, 1907)
Pseudobunaea natalensis (Aurivillius, 1893)
Pseudobunaea orientalis Rougeot, 1972
Pseudobunaea pallens (Sonthonnax, 1901)
Pseudobunaea parathyrrhena (Bouvier, 1927)
Pseudobunaea redlichi (Weymer, 1901)
Pseudobunaea tyrrhena (Westwood, 1849)
Pseudobunaea vingerhoedti Bouyer, 2004

References

Saturniinae
Taxa named by Eugène Louis Bouvier